Iphigenie en Tracia is a zarzuela by José de Nebra, premiered in Madrid, 1747.

Recording
 Marta Almajano, Maria Espada, Raquel Andueza, El Concierto Espanol, Emilio Moreno 2CD Glossa, DDD, 2010

References

1747 operas
Zarzuelas
Spanish-language operas
Baroque compositions
Operas